The Moore Tract is an island in the Sacramento–San Joaquin River Delta. It is in Solano County, California, and administered by Reclamation District 2098 since 1963.

References

Islands of Solano County, California
Islands of the Sacramento–San Joaquin River Delta
Islands of Northern California